Centlein, centrosomal protein is a protein in humans that is encoded by the CNTLN gene.

References

Further reading

External links